The 1968–69 season was Manchester City's 67th season of competitive football and 49th season in the top division of English football. In addition to the First Division, the club competed in the FA Cup, Football League Cup, FA Charity Shield and the European Cup.

First Division

League table

Results summary

References

External links

Manchester City F.C. seasons
Manchester City